Brindabella National Park is an  national park in New South Wales, Australia, that is located approximately  southwest of Sydney central business district in the Brindabella Range. Much of the eastern boundary of the national park forms part of the western border of the Australian Capital Territory with New South Wales.

On 7 November 2008, the park was registered on the Australian National Heritage List as one of eleven areas constituting the Australian Alps National Parks and Reserves.

See also
 Protected areas of New South Wales

References

External links
Brindabella National Parks website
McIntyres Campground
Another website's data

National parks of New South Wales
Protected areas established in 1996
Australian National Heritage List
1996 establishments in Australia
Brindabella Ranges
Australian Alps National Parks and Reserves
Yass Valley Council